Events from the year 1905 in China.

Incumbents 
 Guangxu Emperor (25th year)

Events 
 May 10 — Chinese Boycott of 1905 begins, it is a large-scale boycott of American goods in China in reaction to a string of anti-Chinese events in the United States.
  The boycott originated when the Chinese Consolidated Benevolent Association of San Francisco called upon the people of China to pressure the United States into treating the Chinese immigrants in America better.
 Tibetan rebellion of 1905 in Yunnan province began with a series of attacks on Christian missionaries and converts and ended with the imperial Chinese government re-asserting control of the province.
 20 August 1905 — Tongmenghui,  a secret society and underground resistance movement is founded by Sun Yat-sen, Song Jiaoren, and others in Tokyo, Japan

References